José Rangel Espinosa (born 19 March 1956) is a Mexican politician affiliated with the PRI. As of 2013 he served as Deputy of the LXII Legislature of the Mexican Congress representing the State of Mexico. He also served as Deputy during the LIX Legislature.

References

1956 births
Living people
Politicians from the State of Mexico
Members of the Chamber of Deputies (Mexico)
Institutional Revolutionary Party politicians
21st-century Mexican politicians
Deputies of the LXII Legislature of Mexico